Barton Warren Evermann (October 24, 1853 – September 27, 1932) was an American ichthyologist.

Early life and education 
Evermann was born in Monroe County, Iowa in 1853. His family moved to Indiana while he was still a child and it was there that he grew up, completed his education, and married. Evermann graduated from Indiana University in 1886.

Career 
For 10 years, he served as teacher and superintendent of schools in Indiana and California. While teaching in Carroll County, Indiana Evermann met fellow teacher Meadie Hawkins. They married on October 24, 1875 and had a son, Toxaway Bronte (born 1879) and a daughter, Edith (born). He was professor of biology at the Indiana State University in Terre Haute from 1886 to 1891. He lectured at Stanford University in 1893–1894, at Cornell University in 1900–1903, and at Yale University in 1903–1906.

In the early 20th century, as director of the California Academy of Sciences in San Francisco, he promoted research on the Revillagigedo Islands off the Pacific coast of Mexico. Mount Evermann on Socorro Island, the highest peak of the archipelago, was named in his honor. A species of lizard, Anolis evermanni, is named in his honor.

In 1888, Evermann entered the service of the United States Bureau of Fisheries, became an ichthyologist in 1891, had charge of the division of scientific inquiry in 1903–1911, and from 1910 to 1914 was chief of the Alaska Fisheries Service. Evermann was fur seal commissioner in 1892 and became chairman of the fur seal board in 1908.

Evermann died in Berkeley, California, aged 78.

See also
:Category:Taxa named by Barton Warren Evermann

References

External links 

 
 

19th-century American zoologists
20th-century American zoologists
1853 births
1932 deaths
American ichthyologists
American science writers
American taxonomists
Cornell University faculty
Indiana State University alumni
People from Monroe County, Iowa
Scientists from California
Scientists from the San Francisco Bay Area
United States Fish Commission personnel